Cuphodes wisteriella is a moth of the family Gracillariidae. It is known from Japan.

The wingspan is 8–9 mm.

References

Cuphodes
Moths of Japan
Moths described in 1982